KKSA (1260 AM, Newstalk Sports K-Say) is a radio station broadcasting a news talk information format. It is licensed to San Angelo, Texas, United States. The station is owned by Foster Communications Company and includes programming from CNN Radio, Fox Sports Radio, and Westwood One.

History
The station was assigned the call letters KAYJ on November 29, 1987. On October 5, 1992, the station changed its call sign to KXQZ, and on September 8, 1994, to the current KKSA.

References

External links
Foster Communications Website

KSA
News and talk radio stations in the United States